Barreau is a French surname. Notable people with the surname include:

Andre Barreau, musician
Gaston Barreau (1883–1958), French football player and coach
Gisèle Barreau (born 1948), French composer
Rose-Alexandrine Barreau (1773–1843), French soldier

See also
François Dominique Barreau de Chefdeville (1725–1765), French architect

French-language surnames